Don Murray may refer to:

 Don Murray (clarinetist) (1904–1929), American jazz musician
 Don Murray (actor) (born 1929), American actor
 Don Murray (writer) (1923–2006), writer for the Boston Herald
 Don Murray (drummer) (1945–1996), of the group The Turtles
 Don Murray (footballer) (born 1946), former Cardiff City F.C. defender

See also
 Donald Murray (disambiguation)
 Donald Murphy (disambiguation)